The Taking of Pelham One Two Three is a 1998 American television crime thriller film directed by Félix Enríquez Alcalá and starring Edward James Olmos. It is a television adaptation of the novel of the same name by Morton Freedgood (writing under the pseudonym John Godey), and is a remake of the 1974 film adaptation. It was followed by a 2009 remake.

Premise 
Edward James Olmos plays Detective Anthony Piscotti, a New York City police officer. He is trying to crack the hijacking of a New York City Subway train where the antagonists are holding the passengers for ransom.

Cast 
 Edward James Olmos as Detective Anthony Piscotti
 Vincent D'Onofrio as Mr. Blue
 Richard Schiff as Mr. Green
 Donnie Wahlberg as Mr. Grey
 Tara Rosling as Mr. Brown
 Lisa Vidal as Barbara 'Babs' Cardoza
 Kenneth Welsh as Caz Hollowitz
 Lorraine Bracco as Detective Ray
 Ben Cook as Older Boy On Subway 
 Bobby Boriello as Younger Boy On Subway
 Bobby O'Neill as Homeboy On Subway (as Black Katt)
 Ingrid Veninger as Graduate Student On Subway
 Alisa Wiegers as Office Worker ["Shaky"]
 Peter Boretski as Old Man On Subway
 Stuart Clow as Jogger
 Michael A. Miranda as Denny Alcala
 Sandi Ross as Mrs. Jenkins
 Louis Del Grande as Frank Stonehouse
 Gary Reineke as Deputy Mayor
 Richard Fitzpatrick as Borough Commander
 Roy Lewis as Officer Artis Washington
 Philip Akin as ESU Lieutenant
 Judah Katz as TV Reporter
 Catherine Blythe as Video Camerawoman

Production details 
The film is a remake, with Edward James Olmos in the Walter Matthau role and Vincent D'Onofrio replacing Robert Shaw as the lead hijacker. Although not particularly well received by critics or viewers, this version was reportedly more faithful to the book, specifically in the rigging of the hijacked train for the getaway.

The film was shot in Toronto's TTC subway system, mainly using the system's Bay, St. Andrew and Museum stations, and two of a class of older cars being retired by the TTC. The two cars were shipped by road to the scrapyard the day after filming ended, still disguised as New York cars.

The Toronto subway cars used for filming cannot operate singly, so a two-car set was used. A phony cab was built on the other end of H-1 car 5482 to simulate single car operation. The single car supposedly detached from the front of the train can be seen on several occasions to be part of a train of at least two cars. The most obvious cases are when rounding curves: once when first moving forward after being detached, and later when Anthony has just figured out the hijackers' plan.

Differences from the novel 
Since the film was produced much later than the original, there are also additions to the film that did not exist in the original. For example, one of the characters sets up an IBM ThinkPad laptop computer, connected wirelessly to a motion detector that he places on the track. Later in the film, another character views the screen to see an approaching person, whom he confronts in the tunnel. The ransom demand in the remake was $5 million as opposed to $1 million in the original film and the novel.

Home media 
In 2012, TGG Direct released the film on DVD in full frame in a two-pack that also included Runaway Train (1985).

References

External links 

 

1998 television films
1998 films
1998 action thriller films
1998 crime drama films
1998 crime thriller films
1990s American films
1990s English-language films
1990s police films
ABC network original films
American action thriller films
American crime drama films
American crime thriller films
American police detective films
American thriller television films
Crime film remakes
Crime television films
Films about extortion
Films about hijackings
Films about hostage takings
Films about the New York City Police Department
Films based on adaptations
Films based on American crime novels
Films based on works by Morton Freedgood
Films directed by Félix Enríquez Alcalá
Films scored by Stewart Copeland
Films set on the New York City Subway
Films shot in Toronto
Metro-Goldwyn-Mayer films
Remakes of American films
Television films based on books
Television remakes of films
Thriller film remakes